Aga Sahib Shrine or Ziyarat e Sarkaar or Aga Mehdi Shrine is a religious place of Kashmiri Muslims located at Budgam. In this shrine there are many religious personalities buried include Ayatullah-ul- Uzma Aga Syed Mehdi Al-Mosvi Al-Safvi Al-Najafi, Aga Syed Ahmad Al-Mosvi Al-Safvi Al-Najafi, Aga Syed Yusuf Al-Moosavi Al-Safavi, Aga Syed Mohammad Fazlullah, Aga Syed Mehdi Mustafa, Aga Syed Mustafa Al-Moosavi and others. 

The shrine was constructed by Aga Syed Yousuf himself during his lifetime to honor Sarkar Aga Syed Mehdi Al-Moosavi, who was also Aga Syed Yousuf's grandfather.

See also
 Tomb of Shams-ud-Din Araqi

References

Islamic shrines
Religious buildings and structures in Jammu and Kashmir